José Vicente Beviá Pastor (6 October 1933 – 28 July 2017) was a Spanish politician. He was elected to the Senate in 1977, and served in the Congress of Deputies from 1979 to 2000. Between 1993 and 1996, Beviá Pastor was Deputy Speaker of Congress of Deputies. He began his political career as a member of the People's Socialist Party and joined the Socialist Workers' Party in 1978.

References

1933 births
2017 deaths
Members of the 1st Congress of Deputies (Spain)
Members of the 2nd Congress of Deputies (Spain)
Members of the 3rd Congress of Deputies (Spain)
Members of the 4th Congress of Deputies (Spain)
Members of the 5th Congress of Deputies (Spain)
Members of the 6th Congress of Deputies (Spain)
Members of the Senate of Spain
Spanish Socialist Workers' Party politicians
People from Alacantí